Shelly Grabe (born 1974) is a professor in Social Psychology at the University of California Santa Cruz, where she has affiliations with Feminist Studies and Latin American and Latino Studies. Her research involves women's human rights and globalization and the international attention given to women's empowerment.

Education and career 
Grabe has a BA from Michigan State University. She then moved to the  University of Missouri, Columbia where she earned an MA and a PhD in Psychology in 2004. She also finished a clinical residency at the University of Washington, School of Medicine in 2004. She received an NIH post-doc award to study at the University of Wisconsin from 2004 to 2006 and subsequently was a visiting scholar from 2006 to 2008 when she began her research in Nicaragua. In 2008, Grabe joined the faculty at the University of California at Santa Cruz.

Research
Grabe is known for her work on women's rights and women's empowerment. While at the University of Wisconsin, she worked on women's body objectification and demonstrated that the objectification of women's bodies is deeply embedded in socio-cultural world views and intersects with race/ethnicity, research which has been covered by the media. Her subsequent research relied on relationships with the women's social movement in Nicaragua (Movimiento Autónomo de Mujeres) where she examined social inequities or male dominance in a cross-cultural and interdisciplinary context

In 2014 she was invited to deliver a talk at the United Nations Commission on the Status of Women on gendered structural inequities and social justice. In 2015 she was invited to deliver a keynote address at the American Psychological Association convention in Toronto titled, “Gender (in)justice in a transnational, globalized context: What’s psychology have to do with it?”  

Her 2017 book, " Narrating a Psychology of Resistance: Voices of the Compañeras in Nicaragua", offers a critical perspective on how the intersections of patriarchy and neoliberalism threaten women's human rights and democratic participation in society.

Her edited collection, Women's Human Rights: A Social Psychological Perspective on Resistance, Liberation, and Justice, was published in 2018.

Selected publications

Awards and honors 
In 2015, Grabe received the Georgia Babladelis Best paper award from the American Psychological Association for her paper on land ownership by women. She also received the 2015 Denmark-Reuder Award from the American Psychological Association.

References

External links
 Shelly Grabe's website at U.C. Santa Cruz
 

1974 births
Living people
American social psychologists
American women psychologists
American feminists
University of California, Santa Cruz faculty
Michigan State University alumni
University of Missouri alumni
21st-century American women
Place of birth missing (living people)